The Civil Democratic Movement or Democratic Civil Current or Democratic Civilian Current was a coalition aimed at "establish[ing] a civil force to counter the control of the Muslim Brotherhood and religious movements on the entirety of state institutions". The coalition reportedly had 29 political parties and movements involved in it.

Formerly affiliated parties
Arab Democratic Nasserist Party
Democratic Front Party
Egyptian Citizen Party
Egyptian Communist Party
Egyptian Green Party
Free Egyptians Party
Freedom Egypt Party
Freedom Party
Ghad El-Thawra Party
Liberal Constitutional Party
Liberals Party
Life of the Egyptians Party
New Wafd Party
Socialist Popular Alliance Party
Young Egypt Party

References

2012 establishments in Egypt
Defunct political party alliances in Egypt
Political opposition organizations
Political parties established in 2012
Political parties with year of disestablishment missing